Merkushevo is a rural locality (a village) in Lobanovskoye Rural Settlement, Permsky District, Perm Krai, Russia. The population was 21 as of 2010. There are  4 streets.

Geography 
Merkushevo is located 27 km southeast of Perm (the district's administrative centre) by road. Verkh-Syra is the nearest rural locality.

References 

Rural localities in Permsky District